Shervin, also spelled Sherveen, Shervyn or Sherwin, is a Persian given name. Shervin is a boy's name and it is used for girls with the suffix "Dukht". The name is occasionally given to girls in the form of "Shervineh" or "Shervin Dokht" or "Sharmineh".

The name is understood to mean "immortal and eternal soul" and "like a lion" and also one who is loved by everyone ("beloved of the people").

Shervin is thought to be the shortened form of Anushirvan. One interpretation of the name is a combination of "Anousheh", meaning eternal,  An alternative translation of Shervin is "like a lion", derived from the words "shir", meaning 'lion', and "vin", meaning 'resembling'.

Shervin was also the name of several princes in the ancient Tabarestan region of Iran (today's Mazandaran and Gilan province), including a grandfather of the author of Marzbannameh (Marzban ibn-e Rostam ibn-e Shervin, 12th century).

In Savadkuh County, located at the center of Mazandaran Province in Iran, part of the Alborz mountain chain is named Shervin and is one of the local natural attractions.

Notable people named Shervin include

Business
Shervin Pishevar
Sherwin Pomerantz

Music
Shervin Hajipour

Sport
Shervin Charles
Shervin Radjabali-Fardi

Masculine given names